The January 14–17, 2022 North American winter storm brought widespread impacts and wintry precipitation across large sections of eastern North America and parts of Canada. Forming out of a shortwave trough on January 13, it first produced a swath of snowfall extending from the High Plains to the Midwestern United States. The storm eventually pivoted east and impacted much of the Southern United States from January 15–16 before shifting north into Central Canada, the Mid-Atlantic states, and the Northeastern United States. The system, named Winter Storm Izzy by The Weather Channel, was described as a "Saskatchewan Screamer".

Several states in the Southeast declared states of emergencies ahead of the storm, including as North Carolina, South Carolina, Georgia, and Virginia. The system also spawned seven tornadoes in Florida, one of which was an EF2 that resulted in three injuries.

Meteorological history
A weak area of low pressure developed on January 13 in southwestern Canada along a stationary front from a weakening extratropical cyclone that was impacting the West Coast of the United States. From there, the system drifted southeastwards into the High Plains while delivering heavy snowfall and began moving more southwards through the states of Nebraska, Kansas and Missouri into the early morning hours of January 14. Later that day, at 21:00 UTC the Weather Prediction Center (WPC) began issuing periodic storm summary bulletins on the developing system, albeit with competing areas of low pressure. A stronger low began forming over southern Missouri on January 15, moving into Arkansas and began strengthening due to a strong upper-level low located nearby. Associated cold air in place over the aforementioned areas allowed snow to break out in areas further south, as the system began occluding – with a new low forming just offshore in the northern Gulf of Mexico before moving onshore – later that night as snowfall, ice and mixed precipitation spread eastward towards the Southeastern United States into the early morning hours of January 16. The winter storm began turning more northward later that day into the southern Appalachian Mountains as the two centers began merging.

Preparations

Canada
In response to that, winter storm watches and warnings were issued across a large swath of southern Ontario and southwestern Quebec. This was the first blizzard warning for Toronto since 1993. Winter storm and snowfall warnings were expanded in to parts of central and southwestern Ontario. Ahead of the storm, many school districts cancelled in-person classes for January 17 and 18.

United States
Winter storm watches and warnings were issued across a large swath of the Central and Eastern United States, along with ice storm warnings for several areas in North Carolina and South Carolina due to the potential for ice accumulations. However, in New York City, it was expected to bring rain and strong winds. Amtrak cancelled several trains in advance of the storm.

Southeast
Georgia, Virginia, North Carolina and South Carolina all declared a state of emergency in preparation for the winter storm.

Impacts

Canada

Ontario

In Toronto, the storm prompted the closure of Gardiner Expressway and the Don Valley Parkway for several hours in the early afternoon to remove stranded automobiles and to facilitate plowing, while sections of Highway 401 were blocked by stranded vehicles for up to 12 hours with one section blocked until the late morning of the next day. Near Ottawa, a stretch of Highway 7 was closed to due blizzard conditions and a section of Highway 417 was closed for eight hours due to a fatal accident that killed two people. Some cities' transit systems had difficulties providing service, such as 504 of the Toronto Transit Commission's 1,300 bus fleet and 150 OC Transpo buses being trapped in snow. School boards throughout the Golden Horseshoe closed their schools for both January 17 and 18 while some other school boards closed schools for January 17. The storm temporarily shut down Toronto Pearson International Airport, and forced the cancelation of all flights at Ottawa International Airport.

United States

High Plains and Midwest
There were also 78 car crashes reported, which caused 14 injures.

Parts of Ashtabula County reported  of snow.

Southeast
The Nashville Fire Department in Davidson County, Tennessee, opened a shelter from the cold weather on January 15.

Snow fell in mostly the northern and central part of Alabama with only a trace recorded in most areas. York recorded  while Livingston recorded .

In Georgia, approximately 100,000 customers were without power at the height of the storm on January 16.

In North Carolina, parts of U.S. Route 276 were closed due to icing. The city of Charlotte opened a shelter for those who sought warmth from the cold. The North Carolina Highway Patrol responded to approximately 200 collisions by noon of January 16. A car crash also killed 2 people in Raleigh, North Carolina. Over 90% of flights that day from Charlotte Douglas International Airport were cancelled.

A state of emergency was declared in Virginia due to the storm. Virginia reported 482 car crashes and 486 disabled vehicles.

Florida

The warm side of the storm caused severe thunderstorms, high winds, and several tornadoes in Florida. An EF2 tornado touched down in Iona, damaging numerous homes and causing three injuries. Around 7,000 homes lost power in the state. The Iona tornado caused $10 million in damage. Some parts of the Panhandle saw flurries while in areas in northern Escambia County saw light accumulation, the first snow accumulation observed in the state since a winter storm in 2018.

Northeast

Buffalo received  of snow while areas to the east of Buffalo, such as Medina and Batavia received similar amounts, while Rochester further east received  inches of snow. Schools in the Buffalo area were closed both January 17 and 18 due to the storm. The storm was sufficient enough to make it the third snowiest January day in Buffalo history. In Staten Island, where temperatures remained  or higher during the event, significant rainfall of  fell. In Suffolk County, New York, a 60 knot wind gust was confirmed at 3:46 a.m. EST on January 17.

Winter storm watches were issued in Manchester, Vermont, as well as in Saxtons River. Snow was reported in the Burlington area. Over 1,700 flights were canceled in the state alone.

See also

Weather of 2022
List of North American tornadoes and tornado outbreaks
February 2014 nor'easter
February 2015 Southeastern United States winter storm
February 13–17, 2021 North American winter storm
Great Snowstorm of 1944

Notes

References

External links 

 Archive of Storm Summaries from the Weather Prediction Center

2022 meteorology
Ice storms in the United States
Nor'easters
2021–22 North American winter